Vernonieae is a tribe of about 1300 species of plants in the aster family.  They are mostly found in the tropics and warmer temperate areas, both in the Americas and the Old World. They are mostly herbaceous plants or shrubs, although there is at least one tree species, Vernonia arborea.

Taxonomy 
Vernonieae is considered sister to the tribe Liabeae. The tribe originated in southern Africa or Madagascar, and spread to the Americas in at least two different events.

In many works some 80% of the species in this tribe are classified in the genus Vernonia.  Other authors, like Harold E. Robinson, divide the tribe into a larger number of small genera.

References

External links

 
Asteraceae tribes